The Premier League Player of the Month is an association football award that recognises the best adjudged Premier League player each month of the season. The winner is chosen by a combination of an online public vote, which contributes to 10% of the final tally, a panel of experts, and the captain of each Premier League club. It has been called the Carling Premiership Player of the Month (1994–2001), the Barclaycard Premiership Player of the Month (2001–2004) and the Barclays Player of the Month (2004–2016); it is currently known as the EA Sports Player of the Month.

The Premier League was formed in 1992, when the members of the First Division resigned from the Football League. These clubs set up a new commercially independent league that negotiated its own broadcast and sponsorship agreements. The Premier League introduced new Manager of the Month and Manager of the Season awards for the 1993–94 season, supplementing the existing Football Writers' Association and Professional Footballers' Association Player of the Year awards. For the 1994–95 season, the Premier League introduced the Player of the Month award, which is presented alongside the Manager of the Month award. The first Player of the Month was awarded to Tottenham Hotspur player Jürgen Klinsmann for his performances in August 1994.

Sergio Agüero and Harry Kane have been Player of the Month the most with seven awards each. Nine players have won the award in consecutive months: Robbie Fowler, Dennis Bergkamp, Cristiano Ronaldo, Harry Kane, Jamie Vardy, Mohamed Salah, Bruno Fernandes, İlkay Gündoğan, and Marcus Rashford. Only Mohamed Salah and Marcus Rashford have won the award three times in a single season. Fernandes is the first player to win four awards in one calendar year. Seventeen individuals have won two awards in a season: Robbie Fowler, Dennis Bergkamp, Ruud van Nistelrooy, Thierry Henry, Wayne Rooney, Ryan Giggs, Cristiano Ronaldo, Ashley Young, Peter Odemwingie, Robin van Persie, Daniel Sturridge, Luis Suárez, Harry Kane, Jamie Vardy, Sergio Agüero, Son Heung-min, and Bruno Fernandes. Robbie Keane has won the award while playing for three clubs, while twelve players have won the award playing for two clubs: Alan Shearer, Dion Dublin, David Ginola, Dwight Yorke, Tim Flowers, Teddy Sheringham, Danny Murphy, Andrew Johnson, Nicolas Anelka, Dimitar Berbatov, Scott Parker and Robin van Persie.

The award has been shared on six occasions: by Blackburn Rovers's Alan Shearer and Chris Sutton in November 1994, Liverpool's Robbie Fowler and Stan Collymore in January 1996, Southampton's Kevin Davies and Manchester United's Andy Cole in November 1997, Arsenal's Dennis Bergkamp and Edu in February 2004, Tottenham Hotspur's Dimitar Berbatov and Robbie Keane in April 2007 and Liverpool's Steven Gerrard and Luis Suárez in April 2014. More than four in ten of the Player of the Month awards have gone to English players, and over a quarter of foreign winners have been French or Dutch. Michail Antonio became the first player to win the award with different nationalities, winning in July 2020 as an Englishman and in August 2021 as a Jamaican. Manchester United have had more Player of the Month awards than any other club.

, the most recent recipient of the award is Manchester United player Marcus Rashford.

Key
Players marked  shared the award with another player.
Position key: GK – Goalkeeper; DF – Defender; MF – Midfielder; FW – Forward.

List of winners

Multiple winners

Awards won by nationality

Awards won by position

Awards won by club

Notes

References
General
 Individual seasons accessed via drop-down list.

Specific

Association football player of the month awards
Premier League trophies and awards
Month
Association football player non-biographical articles